T. floribunda may refer to:

 Tabernaemontana floribunda, a plant with fragrant flowers
 Thibaudia floribunda, a New World plant
 Tillandsia floribunda, a plant native to Ecuador
 Tournefortia floribunda, a drupe-bearing plant
 Triphysaria floribunda, a rare broomrape
 Turraea floribunda, a tropical plant
 Tylophora floribunda, a synonym of Vincetoxicum polyanthum, an Australian dogbane